Lesjöfors IF is a sports club in Lesjöfors, Sweden. The club was established in 1924 as a soccer and Nordic skiing club before adopting bandy by the late 1920s. and played 21 seasons in the Swedish men's bandy top division.

References

External links
Official websites 
Lesjöfors IF at the Swedish Football Association's website 

Association football clubs established in 1924

1924 establishments in Sweden
Bandy clubs in Sweden
Football clubs in Värmland County
Bandy clubs established in 1924
Sport in Värmland County